Angelina Cabras (23 December 1898 – 19 June 1993) was an Italian mathematician and physicist. She earned degrees in mathematics from the University of Turin in 1924 and in physics from the University of Cagliari in 1927. She obtained a position in mathematical physics at Cagliari, later moving to the institute of theoretical mechanics there. Her research concerned higher dimensional rigid body dynamics, the theory of relativity, and inductance.

She was an invited speaker at the International Congress of Mathematicians in 1928.

She died in Cagliari in 1993.

References

1898 births
1993 deaths
20th-century Italian mathematicians
20th-century women mathematicians
20th-century Italian women scientists
Italian women mathematicians
20th-century Italian physicists
Italian women physicists
University of Turin alumni
University of Cagliari alumni
Academic staff of the University of Cagliari